Nodake (written: 野嶽) is a Japanese surname. Notable people with the surname include:

, Japanese footballer
, Japanese footballer

Japanese-language surnames